Ellsworth Land is a portion of the Antarctic continent bounded on the west by Marie Byrd Land, on the north by Bellingshausen Sea, on the northeast by the base of Antarctic Peninsula, and on the east by the western margin of the Filchner–Ronne Ice Shelf. It extends between 103°24'W and 79°45'W. The area west of 90°W is unclaimed, the area between 84°W and 90°W is claimed by Chile only, and the remainder by Chile and the United Kingdom as a part of the British Antarctic Territory. Eights Coast stretches between 103°24'W and 89°35'W, and Bryan Coast between 89°35'W and 79°45'W.

It is largely a high ice plateau, but includes the Ellsworth Mountains and a number of scattered mountain groups: Hudson, Jones, Behrendt, Hauberg, Merrick, Sweeney and Scaife Mountains.

This land lies near the center of the area traversed by American explorer Lincoln Ellsworth on an airplane flight during November–December 1935. It was named for him by the Advisory Committee on Antarctic Names in 1962 to commemorate that historic transcontinental flight from Dundee Island to the Ross Ice Shelf.

References

 
British Antarctic Territory
Lands of Antarctica